Pijao (Piajao, Pinao) is an unclassified indigenous American language that was spoken in the villages of Ortega, Coyaima (Koyai, Tupe) and Natagaima in the Magdalena River Valley of Colombia until the 1950s.

Subdivisions
Pijao subtribes reported by Rivet (1943, 1944) and cited in Mason (1950):

Aype, Paloma, Ambeina, Amoya, Tumbo, Coyaima, Poina (Yaporoge), Mayto (Maito, Marto), Mola, Atayma (Otaima), Tuamo, Bulira, Ocaima, Behuni (Beuni, Biuni), Ombecho, Anaitoma, Totumo, Natagaima, Pana (Pamao), Guarro, Hamay, Zeraco, Lucira, and Tonuro.

Classification
A small vocabulary list was collected in 1943; only 30 Pijao words and expressions are known.

The few words which resemble Carib are thought to be loans; toponyms in Pijao country are also Carib. Marshall & Seijas (1973) did not detect significative connections between Pijao and other unclassified languages of the area: Colima, Muzo, Pantágora, and Panche, but these are even more poorly attested than Pijao.

Jolkesky (2016) also notes that there are lexical similarities with the Witoto-Okaina languages.

Vocabulary

 amé tree
 homéro bow
 sumén to drink
 čaguála canoe
 kahírre dog
 alamán crocodile
 tínki tooth
 tána water
 nasés house
 hoté star
 nuhúgi woman
 oréma man
 yaguáde jaguar
 núna moon
 ñáma hand
 golúpa cassava
 lún eye
 oléma ear
 pegil foot
 tápe stone
 orái red
 toléma snake
 huíl sun
 tenú tobacco

Notes

References

 Marshall Durbin & Haydée Seijas (1973): "A Note on Panche, Pijao, Pantagora (Palenque), Colima and Muzo", International Journal of American Linguistics, Vol. 39, No. 1 (Jan., 1973), pp. 47–51.

Indigenous languages of the South American Northwest
Languages of Colombia
Unclassified languages of South America
Indigenous languages of South America